Chitra Chinta is an annual cine journal published by Gauhati Cine Club. The journal is the brainchild of Bhabendra Nath Saikia, noted Assamese filmmaker who started publishing it in the early part of the last century. It was an irregularly published newsletter until 2003 when it was redesigned as an annual magazine. It covers contributions from all the stalwarts of Assamese literature and film critics. The journal won the prestigious Prag Cine Award.

See also
List of Assamese periodicals

References

2003 establishments in Assam
Annual magazines
Assamese-language mass media
Film magazines published in India
Magazines established in 2003